A runt is a smaller specimen in a group of animals, usually of offspring in a litter.

Runt or Runts may also refer to:

Arts and entertainment

Fictional characters
Runt, of the duo Rita and Runt, in the TV series Animaniacs
Runt, in the video game Simon the Sorcerer II: The Lion, the Wizard and the Wardrobe
Runt, in the film Disco Pigs
Runts, characters in the video game Quadrun
The Runts, a gang in the film City of God
Runt, in the 2005 Disney film Chicken Little

Other arts and entertainment
Runt (album), a 1970 album by Todd Rundgren, originally credited to the band Runt
Runt. The Ballad of Todd Rundgren, a 1971 album by Todd Rundgren
Runt (novel), a 2002 children's novel by Marion Dane Bauer
Runt (film), a 2020 American thriller film

People
C. W. Bishop (1890–1971), U.S. Congressman from Illinois nicknamed "Runt"
Runt Marr (1891–1981), American baseball player, manager and scout
Runt Wolfe, pseudonym of Moe Berg (1902–1972), Major League Baseball Player and World War II Allied spy
Brother Runt or simply Runt, ringname of Matt Hyson (Spike Dudley), American professional wrestler

Science and technology
RUNT Linux, ResNet USB Network Tester, a Linux distro
Runt domain, an evolutionary conserved protein domain
Runt frame, an Ethernet frame shorter than the minimum of 64 bytes
The "Runt" device, a prototype hydrogen bomb detonated in the Castle Romeo test
Runt pulse, a narrow pulse that does not reach a valid high or low level

Other uses
Runt Distribution, a US record company
Runts, a brand of candy

Lists of people by nickname